William Phillip Dickens (June 29, 1914 – November 16, 1983) was an American football player, coach of football, basketball and baseball, and college athletics administrator.  He served as the head football coach at Wofford College (1947–1952), the University of Wyoming  (1953–1956), and Indiana University Bloomington (1958–1964), compiling a career record of 89–68–10. Dickens was also the head basketball coach at Wofford for one season in 1941–42, tallying a mark of 10–14, Wofford' head baseball coach for two seasons, from 1941 to 1942, and the school's athletic director from 1947 to 1952.

During his tenure at Indiana, Dickens compiled a 20–41–2 record. His best season came in 1958, where his Hoosiers went 5–3–1, with upset wins over Michigan State, and Michigan; earning him Big Ten/Midwest Coach of the Year and third place as National Coach of the Year. He was inducted into the Indiana Football Hall of Fame in 1974.  Dickens attended the University of Tennessee, where he was a third-team All-American in 1936 and All-SEC in 1936 at halfback.

Controversy
During his time at Indiana University, Dickens was investigated for violations in athletic recruiting. Dickens was hired as the head football coach at Indiana in 1957 after his success at Wofford College and Wyoming. Knowing that the Hoosiers were at a recruiting disadvantage, Dickens blatantly disregarded the rules, with reports of 17 violations by the Indiana football program in his first three months. Reports stated that the school offered, "$50 per month, or expense-paid travel between the prospects hometown and Bloomington." Although no offenses were consummated, Indiana chose to forbid Dickens from performing any coaching related activities during the 1957 football season. Additionally, Indiana was placed on probation for one year by the NCAA.

On December 22, 1964, Dickens resigned as Indiana's head football coach and was given a new position as the university's general manager of off-campus physical facilities. In seven seasons, he compiled a 20–41–2 record with the Hoosiers. Due to over-zealous recruiting, he had been suspended for the 1957 season, and the team had been placed on probation from 1960 to 1963.

Head coaching record

Football

References

1914 births
1983 deaths
American men's basketball coaches
American football halfbacks
Indiana Hoosiers football coaches
Mississippi State Bulldogs football coaches
NC State Wolfpack football coaches
Tennessee Volunteers football players
Wofford Terriers athletic directors
Wofford Terriers baseball coaches
Wofford Terriers football coaches
Wofford Terriers men's basketball coaches
Wyoming Cowboys football coaches